Hadramphus tuberculatus (known as the Canterbury knobbled weevil, Spaniard weevil or Banks Peninsula speargrass weevil) is a rare weevil endemic to Canterbury in the South Island of New Zealand. It was thought to be extinct in 1922 but was rediscovered in 2004.

Description
H. tuberculatus is a flightless weevil with a knobbed back. It has a dark brown body with greyish-brown scales. This species tends to survive at high altitudes, specifically 670 meters, within the department of conservation reserve, where Aciphylla, a type of plant species, is abundant (Marris et al., 2008). In addition, in a study done where the ecology and conservation status of the Hadramphus tuberculatus was measured, it was found that the population size decreased from 2009 through 2011 – with the estimated population sizes being 138, 90, and 76, respectively (Fountain et al., 2013).

Taxonomy
This species was first described by Francis Pascoe in 1877 using specimens collected in Canterbury and supplied by Charles Marcus Wakefield. Hadramphus tuberculatus are characterized within the genus of weevils. They belong to the Molytini tribe which consists of four other species: H. tuberculatus, H. spinipennis Broun, H. stilbocarpae Kuschel, and H. pittospori. The Hadramphus tuberculatus are the largest weevils in terms of size and their distiniction stems from having rounded tubercles on their backs. In comparison, all four species are on the risk in terms of conservation (Cruickshank et al., 2018).

Status
The knobbled weevil were apparently common over the Canterbury Plains in the 1870s. Possible causes for its disappearance were the removal by farmers of speargrass (Aciphylla), its host plant, and the arrival of predatory European rats. It was last seen in 1922, and was considered extinct until it was rediscovered in late 2004 by research students of the University of Canterbury at Burkes Pass near Lake Tekapo, South Canterbury, New Zealand. It is now listed as nationally endangered by the New Zealand Department of Conservation, and as critically endangered in the IUCN Red List. A detailed ecological study conducted by researchers at Lincoln University in 2009–2011 estimated the population size at Burkes Pass to be only 138 individuals in 2009, decreasing each year to 76 in 2011.

Gallery of images

References

External links

 Description and Image, PDF 
 Image of a Museum specimen, PDF
 Past distribution of large weevils (Coleoptera: Curculionidae) in the South Island, New Zealand, based on Holocene fossil remains
 Discovery brings weevil back from the brink 
 Hadramphus tuberculatus discussed on RNZ Critter of the Week, 23 October 2015

Beetles of New Zealand
Molytinae
Beetles described in 1877
Endangered biota of New Zealand
Endemic fauna of New Zealand
Taxa named by Francis Polkinghorne Pascoe
Endemic insects of New Zealand